John McBryde (born 9 March 1939, Maryborough, Queensland) is an Australian field hockey player who competed in the 1960 Summer Olympics and Captained the team in the 1964 Summer Olympics, winning the first Australian hockey medal, a bronze.

References

External links
 

1939 births
Living people
Australian male field hockey players
Olympic field hockey players of Australia
Field hockey players at the 1960 Summer Olympics
Field hockey players at the 1964 Summer Olympics
Olympic bronze medalists for Australia
Olympic medalists in field hockey
Medalists at the 1964 Summer Olympics